High Bridge is an unincorporated community and census-designated place in Jessamine County, Kentucky, United States. As of the 2010 census it had a population of 242. It lies along the lower reaches of the Kentucky River across from the confluence of the Dix River with the Kentucky.  The community is part of the Lexington–Fayette Metropolitan Statistical Area.

History
A post office was established in 1879 in the community then known as "North Tower". In 1888, the town was renamed for the landmark High Bridge, a nearly  railroad bridge over the Kentucky River. The first bridge was planned by John Roebling as a suspension bridge, but ultimately built as a cantilever bridge. The current bridge, the second one on these foundations, is the highest railroad bridge in the United States over a navigable river. The Kentucky River runs through the Kentucky River Palisades for much of the lower portion of its length.  Most of the bridges over it in the area are relatively high ones.

High Bridge was opened in 1876 and was the first cantilever bridge in North America. Standing  over the river between the Palisades, it first carried both passenger and freight trains. The American Society of Civil Engineers has designated it a National Historic Civil Engineering Landmark. The 1876 bridge was replaced in 1911 by a more robust bridge in the same place. Freight trains of the Norfolk Southern Railway still use this bridge several times a day.

The Palisades were a popular spot for picnics and dances, as breezes from the river gorge kept it comfortable. An open-air roofed ballroom was built there for community dances and has been preserved. A small playground and park adjoin the Palisades property.

A brand of bottled water named for the community depicts the bridge on its label. Highbridge Springs water is well-known to the University of Kentucky Wildcats. The Wildcat mascot is used on the bottle label to show support for the team. The bottle name is "Swish".

Bethel Academy, the first Methodist school west of the Appalachians, was established in the High Bridge vicinity in 1790.

Geography
The High Bridge census-designated place consists of the community of High Bridge as well as rural land comprising the inside of the bend on the Kentucky River where the bridge is located.

Demographics

References

External links
Jessamine County Kentucky Tourism - High Bridge
High Bridge Springs Water
Digitized images from the Louis Edward Nollau High Bridge Photographic Collection, 1910-1912, housed at the University of Kentucky Libraries Special Collections Research Center

Census-designated places in Kentucky
Unincorporated communities in Jessamine County, Kentucky
Unincorporated communities in Kentucky
Lexington–Fayette metropolitan area